Clark may refer to the following areas in the Philippines:

 Clark Air Base, a former American air base on Luzon Island, now used by the Philippine Air Force
 Clark Freeport and Special Economic Zone (CFEZ), an area in Central Luzon spanning Tarlac and Pampanga
 Clark Global City, a planned development in Mabalacat, Pampanga, within the Clark Freeport Zone
 New Clark City, a planned development in Capas and Bamban, Tarlac, within the Clark Special Economic Zone
 Metro Clark, a area roughly covering portions of Tarlac and Pampanga

See also
 Clark International Airport, in Clark Freeport and Special Economic Zone
 Clark International Speedway, a racing circuit in Clark Freeport and Special Economic Zone